= Food and Nutrition Products v Neumann =

Meaning of food nutrition

Food & Nutritional Products (Pty) Ltd v Neumann is an important case in South African law. An exception to a special plea, it was heard in the Witwatersrand Local Division by Schabort J on May 1, 1985, with judgment handed down on June 7. The excipient's attorneys were Moss-Morris, Mendelow, Braude. The respondent's attorney was Nathan BK Luen. PN Levenberg appeared for the excipient and SJ Nochumsohn for the respondent.

It is frequently the case that legislation provides that a party may "apply" or "make application" to court for relief of a particular type. While the court may then be approached on motion, despite the foreseeability of a dispute of fact, statutory provisions of this nature will not be interpreted as rendering application proceedings peremptory in every case; sometimes proceedings by way of action will be permitted instead.

In casu, the court found that the word "application," in section 424(1) of the Companies Act. was not intended to have the narrow meaning of proceedings only by way of motion. Proceedings under the section might therefore be by way of action as well.
